Queen's Royal College (St.Clair, Trinidad), referred to for short as QRC, or "The College" by alumni, is a secondary school in Trinidad and Tobago. Originally a boarding school and grammar school, the secular college is selective and noted for its German Renaissance architecture, academic performance and alumni representation in sports, politics and science in Trinidad and Tobago and globally.

History
The origin of QRC goes back to the Stuart Grammar School, at the corner of Duke and Edward Street in Port of Spain, whose Principal was Edward Stuart. In 1859, when a new "collegiate school" was being contemplated, Stuart was invited by the colonial government to be part of the enterprise. The Queen's Collegiate School opened later that year opposite what is now Lord Harris Square, then known as Billiards Orchard. QRC was originally a fee paying (British public school American private) school and was expressly secular.

The intention was, as Governor Arthur Hamilton-Gordon told the Legislative Council in 1870, "that its advantages should be open to those of every race and every religion, and that the education given should be of a decidedly superior character."

In 1870, the school became the Queen's Royal College and was housed in the supper room of the Prince's Building.

When the Government Farm moved from St Clair in 1899, part of the land was reserved as a new home for QRC through the intervention of acting Governor Sir Micah Fields.

The school, referred to in those days as Royal College, had 120 pupils, who did not wear a uniform but had to wear a hat or cap bearing the college crest. They learned algebra, geometry, arithmetic, Latin, French, English, geography, history and Greek or Spanish.

Today in Queen's Royal College uniforms are worn, and QRC projects and involvements usually involve a blue theme, due to the uniform of blue shirt jack and long khaki pants. In 2009, the school implemented a new dress uniform for formal occasions.

Its principal is David Simon.

Architecture and history of the main block

The foundation stone was laid on 11 November 1902 by Courtney Knollys, who was the acting Governor of the day. The structure was designed by Daniel M. Hahn, who was Chief Draughtsman of the Public Work Department and an Old Boy of Queen's Royal College, during the period when the school was housed at the Princess Building. He is also noted for designing the nations Parliament building the Red House. The architecture of the building is German Renaissance in style, evident by the solid appearance. Constructed at a cost of 15000 British pounds, 1,845,000.00 British pounds adjusted for inflation, the original building accommodated six classes for 30 boys each. The lecture hall could hold over five hundred persons at a time.

General information

The main building itself is one of the Magnificent Seven, a group of historic buildings built in the early 1900s. The North and South buildings, known as the North Block and Science Block respectively, were built during the late 1930s. The school has its own pavilion and canteen, both located on the edge of its field, used in all seasons for various sports.

Classes

Queen's Royal College, as a secondary school in Trinidad & Tobago consists of classes from Form One through Form Six. The school can be termed a "seven-year" school but qualification into Form Six is based on the student's performance at the CSEC (Caribbean Secondary Education Certificate) examinations. Classes are categorized by name according to the word "ROYAL" but now excludes the letter "A" which was used for an accelerated class to what was then the GCE 'O' Level which students sat after four years rather than the usual five . Form One consists of three classes, 1R, 1O and 1Y whereas, Forms 2 through 5 consists of xR, xO, xY and xL where x represents the class number. All students in each class from forms 2-upper 6 are in the same school house. External students can also gain access into the Sixth Form Level based on their qualifications and other academic factors. On average, up to ten external students enter the Sixth Form level per year.

Subjects offered at Form Six level

The following subjects apply to both Lower Six (year one) and Upper Six (year two). Subjects are usually divided into Unit 1 and Unit 2 with the exclusion of Caribbean Studies which is usually assigned to the first year in Form Six or Lower Six and Communication Studies to the second year in Form Six or Upper Six. All subjects are of the Caribbean Advanced Proficiency Examination (CAPE) format and students are allowed to do a minimum of four subjects, but exceptions are sometimes accepted.

As of July 2012

BUSINESS STUDIES

 Accounting
 Economics
 Management of Business (Business Studies or M.O.B)

MODERN STUDIES

 Art and Design
 French
 History
 Literature in English
 Sociology (offered as a Modern subject although it is a Science)
 Spanish

SCIENCE STUDIES

 Biology
 Chemistry
 Geography
 Physics
 Pure Mathematics
 Applied Mathematics

COMPULSORY SUBJECTS

 Caribbean Studies
 Communication Studies

Notable alumni

 Clive Abdulah (b. 1926), former Bishop of Trinidad
 Lloyd Best (1934–2007), economist, essayist, politician, scholar. Founder of the "Plantation school" of economics
 Ralph de Boissière (1907–2008), novelist
 Marc Burns (born 1983), athlete and 2008 Olympic medallist –  relay
 Rudranath Capildeo (1920–1970) –, mathematician, politician
 Dr E. F. Gordon (1895–1955), physician, civil-rights activist and labour leader in Bermuda
 Jehue Gordon (b. 1991), track and field athlete
 Boscoe Holder (1921–2007), artist, dancer and choreographer
 Geoffrey Holder (1930–2014), actor, dancer and choreographer
 Darcus Howe (1943–2017), broadcaster, writer and civil liberties campaigner
 Karl Hudson-Phillips (1933–2014), jurist, politician; former judge of the International Criminal Court and former Attorney General of Trinidad and Tobago
 C. L. R. James (1901–1989), pre-eminent Caribbean philosopher, historian, novelist, essayist, political theorist and cricket writer. James writes about his schooldays at QRC in his classic cricket memoir Beyond a Boundary (1963)
 Ian McDonald (born 1933), Guyana-based writer
 Kynaston McShine (1935–2018), museum curator; recognized as the first person of colour at a major American museum
 Peter Minshall (b. 1941), artist, Trinidad carnival masman, designer of opening ceremony for the Olympic Games of Atlanta 1996, Emmy Award-winner
 Wendell Mottley (b. 1941), 1964 Olympic silver medallist and politician; former Minister of Finance
 Deryck Murray (b. 1943), West Indian wicket-keeper in cricket
 Shiva Naipaul (1945–1985), novelist and journalist
 Sir Vidia Naipaul (1932–2018), Nobel Prize–winning author. QRC is memorialised in his masterpiece novel A House for Mr. Biswas (1961)
 George Maxwell Richards (1931–2018), engineer, academician, former President of Trinidad and Tobago
 Richard Thompson (b. 1985), athlete and 2008 Olympic medallist – 100m;  relay
 Air Vice-Marshal Claude McClean Vincent (1896–1967), Royal Air Force officer
 Eric A. Williams, geologist, former politician and Minister of Energy
 Eric Eustace Williams (1911–1981), historian, first Prime Minister of Trinidad and Tobago regarded as the Father of the nation.

School House system 

All students in each class from forms 2 to upper 6 are in the same school house. The Houses are named after the most notable alumni of the college.

For example, House Naipaul Murray is named after Sir Vidia Naipaul FRAS TC and Deryck Murray.

Houses compete in internal Competitions Cross Country and "One Lap Savannah", to win points for their house leading up to Sports Day. Sports Day is a yearly series of competitive games in track and field, water polo, marathon and March Pass. 

Leading up to Sport Day, each house has designated days for bake sales to raise funds for march pass uniforms. House captains are appointed to organize athletes and train persons in marching. Teachers are also designated houses yearly based on the house of their form class. It is customary for all form one students to March, and for forms 2–upper 6 it is voluntary. 

Houses also compete in the yearly Royal Games that include Royal League (Soccer) and Royal Hoops (Basketball).

Sports and clubs offered

Sports 
A variety of sports are offered by the college they are often sponsored by a local or international corporate body, the sports offered include:

 Football
 Rugby
 Rowing (Dragon Boat Racing)
 Water Polo 
 Field Hockey
 Basketball
 Chess
 Cricket

Clubs/Societies 

 Photography Club
 Debate Club
 Environmental Club
 Inter School Christian Fellowship (ISCF)
 Hindu Community
 Music Club
 Scout Troup 1 (Oldest in the Caribbean) 
 Fitness club
 Chess Club
 School Band

(More may be present but not stated above)

See also 
 List of schools in Trinidad and Tobago
 Royal college

References

External links
 Queen's Royal College Online

Schools in Trinidad and Tobago
Buildings and structures in Port of Spain